"Mafia" (stylized in all caps) is a song by American rapper and singer Travis Scott. It was released on November 5, 2021, concurrently with another single, "Escape Plan", which are both a part of a conjoined single titled Escape Plan / Mafia. The song was written by Travis Scott alongside producers Boi-1da and Jahaan Sweet; with additional writing credits going to J. Cole, who provides additional vocals throughout the song.

Credits and personnel
Credits adapted from Tidal.
 
 Travis Scott – vocals, songwriting, recording
 J. Cole – additional vocals, songwriting
 Boi-1da – production, songwriting
 Jahaan Sweet – production, songwriting, piano
 Mike Dean – mixing, mastering
 Derek "206Derek" Anderson – recording, assistant engineering

Charts

References

 

 
2021 singles
2021 songs
Travis Scott songs
Songs written by Travis Scott
Songs written by J. Cole
Songs written by Boi-1da
Song recordings produced by Boi-1da

Epic Records singles
Cactus Jack Records singles